Ternstroemia luquillensis, the palo colorado, is a species of plant in the Pentaphylacaceae family. It is endemic to Puerto Rico.  It is threatened by habitat loss.

References

luquillensis
Endemic flora of Puerto Rico
Critically endangered plants
Taxonomy articles created by Polbot